Vijay Kumar Chaudhary (born 8 January 1957) is an Indian politician. He has been a member of Bihar Legislative Assembly since 1982, and is currently serving as the Cabinet Minister for Finance, Commercial Taxes and Parliamentary Affairs ministries in the Government of Bihar.

He has previously held the posts of  Speaker of Bihar Vidhan Sabha , Leader of Janata Dal (United) Legislature Party in Bihar Legislative Assembly and the Minister for Education, Water Resources, Rural Development, Rural Works Engineering, Information & Public Relations, Agriculture, Animal and Fish Resources ministries in the Government of Bihar. He is considered to be the Number 2 in JDU's pecking order of the Bihar cabinet and is a member of Nitish Kumar's core committee which shapes policies of the Government and the party.

Chaudhary served as the Home Minister-in-charge, putting forth the Government's stand on home affairs in Bihar Legislative Assembly. Known for being an efficient administrator and a soft-spoken person with a clean image, he is a close confidante of Nitish Kumar and was speculated to succeed him as Chief Minister of Bihar following the latter's resignation after the 2014 Lok Sabha polls.

Early life and career 

Choudhary was born in Dalsinghsarai, Samastipur district of Bihar in a Bhumihar family. His father, late Jagdish Prasad Chaudhary, had been a freedom fighter, an Indian National Congress politician and a three term member of the Bihar Legislative Assembly from the Dalsinghsarai constituency. He completed his Master of Arts in history from Patna University in 1979 and joined the State Bank of India as a Probationary Officer in Trivandrum in the same year.

Political career 

After the demise of his legislator father in 1982, Chaudhary resigned from his job and won the subsequent by-election from Dalsinghsarai on a Congress ticket. He was re-elected from Dalsinghsarai for two more terms in 1985 and 1990. During this stint as a legislator from 1982 to 1995, he served as the Deputy Chairman of Bihar State Industrial Development Corporation (BSIDC) and Deputy Chief Whip of the Congress Legislature Party (CLP). He sought re-election again from Dalsinghsarai in 1995 and 2000 but lost the polls.
Chaudhary served as General Secretary of Bihar Pradesh Congress Committee from 2000 to 2005. He joined JD(U) in 2005 and unsuccessfully contested the October 2005 Bihar Legislative Assembly election from Sarairanjan. He was appointed as the General Secretary and Chief Spokesperson of the party in 2008. He continued to serve in this capacity until February 2010, when he was nominated as the President of Bihar JD(U) and led the party during its victory in 2010 Bihar Legislative Assembly election. He himself won the election from Sarairanjan (Vidhan Sabha constituency) with a margin of 17557 votes and was inducted as the Water Resources Minister in the newly formed cabinet, assuming charge on 26 November 2010.

He tendered his resignation from the Council of Ministers on 7 February 2015 to protest the continuance of Jitan Ram Manjhi as Chief Minister despite the election of Nitish Kumar as the Leader of JD(U) Legislature Party.

He was elected as the Leader of JD(U) Legislature Party in the Bihar Legislative Assembly and staked claim to the opposition status. He was subsequently recognized as the Leader of Opposition on 19 February 2015 by then Speaker Uday Narayan Chaudhary. Post victory in the trust vote and Nitish Kumar assuming charge as Chief Minister for the fourth time, he was inducted as the Cabinet Minister for Water Resources with the additional charge of Agriculture, Information & Public Relations and Animal and Fish Resources Departments.

He retained his Sarairanjan (Vidhan Sabha constituency) in 2015 elections with a margin of 34044 votes. He was elected unopposed to the post of Speaker of Bihar Legislative Assembly on 2 December 2015 after consensus was generated on his name among all political parties of the state, including the Opposition BJP. He was re-elected from Sarairanjan (Vidhan Sabha constituency) in the 2020 elections. He was inducted in the Cabinet of Nitish Kumar on 16 November 2020 and allotted the portfolios of Water Resources, Rural Works, Rural Development, Information & Public Relations and Parliamentary Affairs Departments.

Achievements 

As Water Resources Minister, Chaudhary is credited with the completion of Durgawati Reservoir in 2014, a massive irrigation project started in 1976 which got delayed by 38 years due to land acquisition and environmental clearance related issues. His tenure (2010-2015) saw no major floods after the 2008 Bihar flood. Under his leadership, the Water Resources Ministry launched eight river-linking projects at a cost of Rs 4442 crores.

As Speaker of the Legislative Assembly, Chaudhary brought 44 amendments to the Rules of Procedure and Conduct of Business, the most significant of them being the introduction of the concept of 'Confidence Motion' under Rule 109(A), wherein the Government of the day can move a motion to seek confidence from the House. Bihar is the only state in the country with a rule to deal with confidence motion moved by Government of the day. The Nitish Kumar government, with BJP and other NDA constituents as allies, was the first to move a confidence motion in the Assembly, on 28 July 2017, to prove its majority in the lower House. 
He also amended rules to allow inclusion of MLCs in House Committees dealing with financial matters.

He introduced a Question Reply Management System (QRMS) for online receipt of questions from MLAs and provision of answers by concerned Government departments through the same channel. To bring transparency in the recruitment policy of the Legislative Assembly Secretariat, he divested the Office of Speaker of powers of recruitment and awarded the job to a Central agency, also responsible for recruitment in Parliament of India through a competitive and fair process. He has also initiated the implementation of the National e-Vidhan Application Project to make Bihar Legislative Assembly paperless.

He organized workshops to facilitate dialogue between the civil society and legislators for more informed lawmaking. He has also been organizing blood donation camps on the Assembly's foundation day wherein legislators donate blood for use by needy patients.

Under his leadership as the Chairman of the Commonwealth Parliamentary Association Bihar Chapter, the Bihar Legislative Assembly successfully organised the annual conference of Commonwealth Parliamentary Association India Region, attended by both national and international dignitaries, including Chairperson of the Commonwealth Parliamentary Association Emilia Monjowa Lifaka.

Personal life 

He is married to Ganga Choudhary. The couple has a son, Shubhaditya and a daughter, Ankita.

References

External links 

1957 births
Living people
Janata Dal (United) politicians
Indian National Congress politicians
State cabinet ministers of Bihar
People from Samastipur district
Bihar MLAs 1980–1985
Bihar MLAs 1985–1990
Bihar MLAs 1990–1995
Bihar MLAs 2010–2015
Bihar MLAs 2020–2025
Speakers of the Bihar Legislative Assembly
Leaders of the Opposition in the Bihar Legislative Assembly